Juan Carlos Moreno may refer to:
 Juan Carlos Moreno (baseball)
 Juan Carlos Moreno (footballer)

See also
 Juan Moreno (disambiguation)